Benjamin Mugisha, popularly known by his stage name The Ben (born  in Kampala, Uganda to Jean Mbonimpa and Esther Mbabazi) is a Rwandan artist and songwriter. In 2008, he was awarded as the "Best Afro R&B Singer of the Year" by Salax Music awards.

Career
Ben was invited to perform at the 2010 World Cup in Johannesburg, South Africa. In 2010, he moved to the United States where he collaborated with Detroit based hip-hop artist Mike-E Ellison. Later, he was invited to perform at the UN headquarters. Ben's song "I'm in Love", released in October 2012, led to the creation of a new music category at the 2012 Salax Music Award Presentations in Rwanda making him the first ever recipient of Award for Best Music Artist in the Diaspora.

In 2021 Julien Bmjizzo a Rwandan Music video director shot and directed a song titled Why by The Ben and Diamond Platnumz.

Discography

Singles
Urarenze
Ese Nibyo
Amahirwe yanyuma
Incuti nyancuti
Wigenda
 Amaso Ku Maso
 I'm in Love (2012).
 I can See.
 Habibi.
 Fine girl.
 Naremeye.
Ndaje
Vazi (2019)
Suko (2019)
Ngufite kumutima (2020)

Collabos
 Binkolera ft Sheebah Karungi of Uganda.
 No you no life ft B2C of Uganda.
 Ngufite Kumutima ft ZIZOU AL PACINO
This is love ft  Rema Namakula of Uganda
Why ft Diamond Platnumz of Tanzania
Lose control ft Meddy (Rwanda)

Awards
Ben was recognized as Best Afro R&B Singer of the Year at the Salas Music Awards in 2008-2009. In 2009-2010 he again received the award for Best Afro R&B Singer of the Year as well as the country's top music prize, Best  Male Artist. Ben received a Salas Award song of the year in 2010-2011.

References

Living people
1987 births
Rwandan male singers